The 1971–72 Libyan Premier League was the 8th edition of the competition since its inception in 1963.

Overview
It was contested by 11 teams, and Al-Ahly (Benghazi) won the championship.

League standings

References
Libya - List of final tables (RSSSF)

Libyan Premier League seasons
Libya
Premier League